Ceratinia tutia, the tutia clearwing, is a species of butterfly of the family Nymphalidae. It is found from southern Mexico to Brazil. The wingspan is about 52 mm. It is a highly variable species. The larvae of subspecies Ceratinia tutia dorilla have been recorded feeding on Solanum species, including S. antillarum.

Subspecies
 Ceratinia tutia tutia; Venezuela
 Ceratinia tutia azarina (Weymer, 1899); Ecuador and Peru
 Ceratinia tutia callichroma (Staudinger, 1885); Ecuador
 Ceratinia tutia chanchamaya (Haensch, 1905); Peru
 Ceratinia tutia dorilla (Bates, 1864); Nicaragua and Venezuela
 Ceratinia tutia fuscens (Haensch, 1905); Bolivia
 Ceratinia tutia hopfferi (Weymer, 1899); Peru
 Ceratinia tutia poecila (Bates, 1862); Ecuador and Colombia
 Ceratinia tutia poeciloides (Riley, 1919); Brazil
 Ceratinia tutia porrecta (Haensch, 1905); Bolivia
 Ceratinia tutia radiosa (Haensch, 1903); Ecuador
 Ceratinia tutia robusta (Haensch, 1905); Bolivia
 Ceratinia tutia selenides (Weymer, 1899); Peru
 Ceratinia tutia singularis (Rebel, 1902); Ecuador
 Ceratinia tutia tosca (Schaus, 1902); Colombia
 Ceratinia tutia transversa (Hering, 1925); Colombia

References

Butterflies described in 1852
Ithomiini
Fauna of Brazil
Nymphalidae of South America